Keep Reachin Up is a studio album by soul recording collaboration Nicole Willis & The Soul Investigators, released on Timmion Records in 2005. The music is composed and performed by Nicole Willis & The Soul Investigators and the record is produced by Didier Selin. Timmion Records is located in Helsinki, Finland.

The title track was chosen as one of many songs on US President Barack Obama's re–election Spotify playlist in February 2012.

Track listing
"Feeling Free" – 3:37
"If This Ain't Love (Don't Know What Is)" – 3:28
"Keep Reachin' Up" – 3:24
"Blues Downtown" – 5:13
"My Four Leaf Clover" – 2:53
"A Perfect Kind of Love" – 4:01
"Invisible Man" – 2:59
"Holdin' on" – 3:37
"No One's Gonna Love You" – 6:06
"Soul Investigators Theme (Instrumental)" – 2:42
"Outro" (bonus track) – 1:40

Personnel

 Svante Forsbäck – Mastering 
 Maurice Fulton – Composer 
 Erno Haukkala –  Trombone, Horn Arrangements
 Sami Kantelinen – Bass Guitar, Composer
 Jay Kortehisto – Trombone, Soloist  
 Pekka Kuusisto – Violin, Composer 
 Antti Lauronen – Baritone Saxophone, Horn Arrangements 
 Antti Määttänen – Hammond Organ, Piano, Composer
 Jukka Sarapää – Drums, Composer
 Eero Savela – Trumpet, Horn Arrangements 
 Didier Selin – Tambourine, Bass Guitar, Guitar, Composer, Producer 
 The Soul Investigators – Arrangements, Direction
 Jimi Tenor – Flute, Tenor Saxophone, Backing Vocals, Composer, Horn Arrangements 
 Pete Toikkanen – Guitar, Bass Guitar, Composer
 Lasse Tolvanen – Tenor Saxophone, Horn Arrangements
 Nicole Willis – Vocalist, Lyricist, Composer

References

External links
 
 Timmion Records

Nicole Willis albums
2005 albums